Montepulciano is a red Italian wine grape variety that is most noted for being the primary grape behind the DOCG wines Offida Rosso, Montepulciano d'Abruzzo, Montepulciano d'Abruzzo Colline Teramane, Rosso Conero and the DOC wine Rosso Piceno Superiore.

It should not be confused with the similarly named Tuscan wine Vino Nobile di Montepulciano, which is made from predominantly Sangiovese and is named for the town it is produced in, rather than for containing any Montepulciano grapes in the blend.

The grape is widely planted throughout central and southern Italy, most notably in Abruzzo, Lazio, Marche, Molise, Umbria and Apulia, and is a permitted variety in DOC wines produced in 20 of Italy's 95 provinces. Montepulciano is rarely found in northern Italy because the grape has a tendency to ripen late and can be excessively "green" if harvested too early.

When fully ripened, Montepulciano can produce deeply colored wines, with moderate acidity and noticeable extract and alcohol levels.

Origins and confusion with other Montepulciano wines

According to wine expert Jancis Robinson, the Montepulciano grape likely originated in Tuscany and may be related to the Sangiovese, with which it is often confused. Despite this possible origin, the Montepulciano grape still does not seem to have any tangible connection to the town of that name or to the Vino Nobile di Montepulciano, beyond what Robinson describes as "linguistics". Furthermore, despite being widely planted throughout central Italy, the Montepulciano grape is not  grown in the vineyards around the actual town of Montepulciano.

Wine regions
After Sangiovese, Montepulciano is Italy's second most widely dispersed indigenous grape variety. It is a recommended planting in 20 of Italy's 95 provinces and is a permitted or required grape in the red wines of DOCs in Apulia, Molise, Lazio, Umbria, Marche, Emilia-Romagna, Abruzzi and Tuscany. Among the DOCs that are most noted for Montepulciano are Montepulciano d'Abruzzo in Abruzzi, Offida Rosso DOCG, Rosso Conero and Rosso Piceno in Marche. Though it is a secondary variety to Uva di Troia in the Castel Del Monte DOC, according to wine expert Jancis Robinson the character that Montepulciano contributes to the blend as perhaps "its finest incarnation".

DOCs and DOCGs

The following is a list of DOCs and DOCGs that include Montepulciano as a permitted grape variety, along with other grapes that may be included in the blend under varying percentages that are regulated under the DOC/G label. The wines of which Montepulciano must account for a majority of the blend are in bold.

Alezio DOC – (Apulia) can be blended with Negroamaro, Sangiovese and Malvasia
Biferno DOC – (Molise) Must be 60–70% of the wine. Can be blended with Trebbiano Toscano (in rosé and red wines) and Aglianico
Brindisi DOC – (Apulia) can be blended with Negroamaro, Sangiovese and Malvasia
Cacc'e mmitte di Lucera DOC – (Apulia) can be blended with Sumarello, Sangiovese, Malvasia, Trebbiano and Bombino bianco
Castel Del Monte DOC – (Apulia) can be blended with Uva di Troia, Sangiovese, Aglianico and Pinot noir
Castelli Romani DOC – (Lazio) can be blended with Cesanese, Merlot, Sangiovese and Nero Buono
Cerveteri DOC – (Lazio) can be blended with Sangiovese, Cesanese, Canaiolo nero, Carignan and Barbera
Cesanese di Olevano Romano DOC – (Lazio) can be blended with Cesanese, Sangiovese, Barbera, Trebbiano and Bambino bianco
Colli Amerini DOC – (Umbria) can be blended with Sangiovese, Ciliegiolo, Canaiolo, Merlot and Barbera
Colli Etruschi Viterbesi DOC – (Lazio) can be blended with Sangiovese
Colli Maceratesi DOC – (Marche) can be blended with Sangiovese, Cabernet Sauvignon, Cabernet Franc, Ciliegiolo, Lacrima, Merlot and Vernaccia nera
Colli Martani DOC – (Umbria) can be blended with Sangiovese, Canaiolo, Ciliegiolo, Barbera, Merlot, Trebbiano, Grechetto, Malvasia, Garganega and Verdicchio
Colli Perugini DOC – (Umbria) can be blended with Sangiovese, Ciliegiolo, Barbera and Merlot
Colli Pesaresi DOC – (Marche) can be blended with Sangiovese and Ciliegiolo
Colli di Rimini DOC – (Emilia-Romagna) can be blended with Sangiovese, Cabernet Sauvignon, Merlot, Barbera, Terrano and Ancellotta
Collo della Romagna Centrale DOC – (Emilia-Romagna) can be blended with Cabernet Sauvignon, Sangiovese, Barbera and Merlot
Colli della Sabina DOC – (Lazio) can be blended with Sangiovese
Conero DOCG – (Marche) at least 85–100% of the wine with Sangiovese making up the other component
Controguerra DOC – (Abruzzi) At least 60% of the blend. Can be blended with Merlot, Cabernet Sauvignon and Cabernet Franc
Copertino DOC – (Abruzzi) can be blended with Negroamaro, Malvasia and Sangiovese
Cori DOC – (Lazio) can be blended with Nero Buono and Bonvino nero
Esino DOC – (Marche) Along with Sangiovese must be at least 60% of the blend with local varieties filling out the rest
Gioia del Colle DOC – (Apulia) can be blended with Primitivo, Sangiovese, Negroamara and Malvasia
Lacrima di Morro d'Alba DOC – (Marche) can be blended with Lacrima and Verdicchio
Leverano DOC – (Apulia) can be blended with Negroamaro, Malvasia and Sangiovese
Lizzano DOC – (Apulia) can be blended with Negroamaro, Sangiovese, Bombino nero, Pinot noir and Malvasia
Montepulciano d'Abruzzo DOC – (Abruzzi) at 85% of the wine. Can be blended with Sangiovese
Montepulciano d'Abruzzo Colline Teramane DOCG – (Abruzzi)  at least 85% of the wine. Can be blended with Sangiovese
Nardo DOC – (Apulia) can be blended with Negro Amaro and  Malvasia
Offida DOCG – (Marche) at least 50% of the wine. Can be blended with Cabernet Sauvignon
Orta Nova DOC – (Apulia) can be blended with Uva di Troia, Lambrusco Maestri and Trebbiano.
Parrina DOC – (Tuscany) can be blended with Sangiovese, Canaiolo and Colorino
Pentro di Isernia DOC – (Molise) at least 45–55% of the wine with Sangiovese making up the other component.
Rosso Barletta DOC – (Apulia) can be blended with Uva di Troia, Sangiovese and Malbec
Rosso Canosa DOC – (Apulia) can be blended with Uva di Troia and Sangiovese
Rosso di Cerignola DOC – (Apulia) can be blended with Uva di Troia, Negroamaro, Sangiovese, Barbera, Malbec and Trebbiano
Rosso Conero DOC – (Marche) at least 85–100% of the wine with Sangiovese making up the other component
Rosso Orvietano DOC – (Umbria) can be blended with Aleatico, Cabernet Franc, Cabernet Sauvignon, Canaiolo, Ciliegiolo, Merlot, Pinot noir, Sangiovese, Barbera, Cesanese, Colorino and Dolcetto. Can be a varietal with 85% of the blend but that is rarely seen.
Rosso Piceno DOC – (Marche) can be blended with Sangiovese, Trebbiano and Passerino
San Severo DOC – (Apulia) at least 70–100% of the blend with Sangiovese making up the other component
Tarquinia DOC – (Lazio) either/or with Sangiovese to make up a minimum 60% of the wine. Can be blended with Cesanese
Torgiano DOC – (Umbria) can be blended with Sangiovese, Canaiolo, Trebbiano and Ciliegiolo
Torgiano Rosso Riserva DOCG – (Umbria) can be blend with Sangiovese, Canaiolo, Trebbiano and Ciliegiolo.
Velletri DOC – (Lazio) can be blended with Sangiovese, Cesanese, Bombino nero, Merlot and Ciliegiolo
Vernaccia di Serrapetrona DOCG – (Marche) can be blend with Vernaccia di Serrapetrona, Sangiovese and Ciliegiolo

 Viticulture and wines 

Montepulciano ripens late and has a tendency to favor producing large yields. The grapes can be plump with a low skin to juice ratio. However, the skin has a fair amount of pigmented tannins and color producing phenols that with maceration can produce either a deep ruby colored wine or a pink Cerasuolo wine. Compared to most Italian varieties, Montepulciano has moderately low acidity and more mild (i.e. softer) than bitter edged tannins. Wine expert Oz Clarke describes Montepulciano as producing a "round, plummy and weighty red with ripe tannins, good acidity and a low price tag." Jancis Robinson evaluates Montepulciano as a "promising variety"'' that produces smooth, drinkable wines that can improve for three or four years after vintage.

Synonyms 
Various synonyms have been used to describe Montepulciano and its wines, including Cordicso, Cordiscio, Cordisco, Cordisio, Monte Pulciano, Montepulciano Cordesco, Montepulciano di Torre de Passeri, Montepulciano Primatico,  Morellone, Premutico, Primaticcio, Primutico, Sangiovese Cardisco, Sangiovese Cordisco, Sangiovetto, Torre dei Passeri, Uva Abruzzese and Uva Abruzzi.

Outside Italy
Montepulciano is also grown in Turkey (Kemalpasa), Australia, Mexico, New Zealand, and the United States (California, North Carolina, and Texas).

See also
List of Italian grape varieties

References

Red wine grape varieties
Wine grapes of Italy